is a Japanese manga series written and illustrated by Ken Akamatsu. It was adapted into a 24 episode anime series by Xebec, which aired in Japan on TV Tokyo from April 19, 2000 to September 27, 2000. Both songs were written by Ritsuko Okazaki and performed by Megumi Hayashibara. The two themes were released as a CD single, which debuted on the Oricon charts at Number 7. A 25th episode was later created and released as a DVD bonus. The series and bonus episode were directed by Yoshiaki Iwasaki, written by Shō Aikawa and featured character designs by Makoto Uno. After the series finished, Christmas and Spring specials followed, and finally a three-part original video animation (OVA) series called Love Hina Again. The series follows the daily life of Keitaro Urashima, the manager of an all-girls dorm, as he attempts to pass the Tokyo University entrance exams and to find the girl he promised to enter Tokyo U with when he was a child.

In Japan, the series was released on nine DVDs by Starchild Records between August 3, 2000 and April 2, 2001. Several volumes were also released with a bundled character figure for an additional price. The Christmas special was released on July 4, 2001, and the spring special was released on August 1, 2001. Love Hina Again was released as 3 separate DVDs between January 26, 2002 and March 27, 2002. A complete box set containing the entire TV series, the two specials, and the OVA series was released on July 6, 2005.

The series was originally licensed in North America by Bandai and released across six DVDs from February 19, 2002 to November 19, 2002. The Christmas special was released on December 3, 2002 and followed by the Spring special on March 18, 2003. Love Hina Again was released on September 2, 2003. A box set containing the Christmas and Spring specials and Love Hina Again was released as "Love Hina Movie Set" on September 4, 2002. A complete box set of the television series, Christmas Special, Spring Special and Love Hina Again was released on September 28, 2004 as "Love Hina - Perfect Collection". A complete box set of the television series was released on June 27, 2006 as "Love Hina Anime Legends Complete Collection". In July 2007, Funimation Entertainment announced they had acquired the license to Love Hina after Bandai's license had expired, and a box set of the series over 4 discs was released on February 24, 2009.

In the United Kingdom, Love Hina is licensed by MVM Films, who released the series on six DVDs between September 6, 2004 and March 7, 2004. A box set was released on May 14, 2007. The Christmas and Spring specials were released out of order, with the Spring special released on May 16, 2005, and the Christmas special on November 7, 2005. Love Hina Again was released on January 8, 2008. A box set containing the Christmas and Spring specials and Love Hina Again was released as "Love Hina - Specials Collection" on September 4, 2002.

Love Hina is also licensed in Australia and New Zealand by Madman Entertainment, who released the series across six DVDs between September 18, 2002, and February 11, 2003. A box set was released on December 3, 2003. A box set containing the specials and Love Hina Again was released on March 14, 2007.

Episodes

TV specials

OVAs 
Love Hina Again

See also 
List of Love Hina characters
List of Love Hina chapters

References 

Episodes
Love Hina